Armand Uolevi Lohikoski (January 3, 1912 – March 20, 2005) was an American born Finnish movie director and writer. He is best known as a director of a number of Pekka ja Pätkä movies.

Career
Before his career as a film director Armand Lohikoski had a long career in the media industry. He was, among other occupations, a journalist, a division director in the Finnish Broadcasting Company (where he produced the first radio quiz in Finland), and a head of the Helsinki office of Metro-Goldwyn-Mayer Films. He was also the first to publish free newspapers in Finland.

Armand Lohikoski directed 18 long movies for the major Finnish movie production company Suomen Filmiteollisuus. In addition, he directed many short films and commercials. Both before and during his directing career, he took part in acting. He acted in some of his own films.

Lohikoski wrote an travel book Dollari on lujassa in 1946 of the famous Helsinki based student choir, YL Male Voice Choir, visit to United States after the World War II. He wrote his own biography Mies Puupää-filmien takaa in 1993 and an aphorisms book Sattuvasti Sanottua in 2002. He died after a short illness in Helsinki.

Filmography

Director
Island Girl, 1953
Me tulemme taas, 1953
Pekka Puupää kesälaitumilla, 1953
Hei, rillumarei!, 1954
Minä soitan sinulle illalla, 1954
Pekka ja Pätkä lumimiehen jäljillä, 1954
Pekka ja Pätkä puistotäteinä, 1955
Kiinni on ja pysyy, 1955
Pekka ja Pätkä pahassa pulassa, 1955
Risti ja liekki, 1957
Pekka ja Pätkä ketjukolarissa, 1957
Pekka ja Pätkä salapoliiseina, 1957
Pekka ja Pätkä sammakkomiehinä, 1957
Kahden ladun poikki, 1958
Pekka ja Pätkä Suezilla, 1958
Pekka ja Pätkä miljonääreinä, 1958
Pekka ja Pätkä mestarimaalareina, 1959
Kohtalo tekee siirron, 1959
Taape tähtenä, 1962

Writer
Pekka ja Pätkä lumimiehen jäljillä, 1954
Pekka ja Pätkä ketjukolarissa, 1957
Pekka ja Pätkä salapoliiseina, 1957
Pekka ja Pätkä sammakkomiehinä, 1957
Pekka ja Pätkä Suezilla, 1958
Pekka ja Pätkä miljonääreinä, 1958
Pekka ja Pätkä mestarimaalareina, 1959
Kohtalo tekee siirron, 1959
Taape tähtenä, 1962

Actor
Ryhmy ja Romppainen, 1941, Doorman
Synnin puumerkkki, 1942, Factory owner
Tyttö astuu elämään, 1943, Colonel's assistant
Varjoja Kannaksella, 1943, Customs officer
Tähtireportterit tulevat, 1945, Robber
Pekka ja Pätkä pahassa pulassa, 1955, Radio voice
Kiinni on ja pysyy, 1955, Shopkeeper
Pekka ja Pätkä ketjukolarissa, 1957, Professor Karhu
Pekka ja Pätkä Suezilla, 1958, Suez air control

External links

1912 births
2005 deaths
Finnish film directors
People from Astoria, Oregon
American emigrants to Finland